Pseudopostega bidorsalis is a moth of the family Opostegidae. It was described by Donald R. Davis and Jonas R. Stonis, 2007. It is known from northern Costa Rica.

The length of the forewings is 2.5–3 mm. Adults have been recorded from August to October and January.

Etymology
The species name refers to two major morphological characters of this moth, which are derived from the Latin bi (meaning two, double) in reference to the  bifurcate apex of the male gnathos, and dorsualis or dorsalis (meaning of the back) in reference to the prominent forewing dorsal spot.

References

Opostegidae
Moths described in 2007